Justin Strnad (born August 21, 1996) is an American football linebacker for the Denver Broncos of the National Football League (NFL). He played college football at Wake Forest.

College career
After playing high school football at East Lake in Tarpon Springs, Florida, Strnad committed to Wake Forest over Illinois, Iowa State, Marshall, Florida International and others who offered him scholarships.
Strnad redshirted his freshman year at Wake Forest, but then played in all 13 games his redshirt freshman year. He again played as a reserve linebacker his sophomore year, but led the Demon Deacons in special teams tackles and interceptions. He moved up to a starting role as a junior, earning Honorable Mention all-ACC honors. A torn biceps tendon, suffered against Florida State in October, ended his senior season. Strnad registered two sacks and an interception in his shortened senior season; the interception was a key play late for Wake Forest in a 38–35 win over Utah State. He was once again named Honorable Mention all-ACC for 2019. Strnad garnered an invite to the 2020 Senior Bowl, but did not participate due to injury.

Professional career

Strnad was selected by the Denver Broncos in the fifth round with the 178th overall pick in the 2020 NFL Draft. He was placed on injured reserve on August 31, 2020 after undergoing season-ending wrist surgery.

References

External links
Wake Forest bio

1996 births
Living people
People from Palm Harbor, Florida
Players of American football from Florida
Sportspeople from Pinellas County, Florida
American football linebackers
Wake Forest Demon Deacons football players
Denver Broncos players